Oleh Yuryevich Yefimchuk (Russian: Олег Ефимчук; born 15 March 1994) is a Ukrainian former footballer who is last known to have played as a defender for Green Streets.

Career

Before the 2018 season, Yefimchuk signed for Maldivian side Green Streets from Metalurh (Zaporizhya) in the Ukrainian third division.

References

External links

 
 

Expatriate footballers in the Maldives
Living people
Ukrainian footballers
Ukrainian expatriate footballers
Association football defenders
1994 births
Sportspeople from Donetsk Oblast
FC Metalurh Zaporizhzhia players